Kanku is a 1969 Gujarati social drama film, starring Kishore Bhatt, Kishore Jariwala, Pallavi Mehta, directed by Kantilal Rathod. The film was adapted from Pannalal Patel's short story of the same name. The film won National Film Award for Best Feature Film in Gujarati at the 17th National Film Awards.

Plot
The film deals with struggles of a widow, Kanku (Pallavi Mehta).

Production
Gujarati writer Pannalal Patel had written a 20-pages long short story Kanku in 1936 for Diwali Special edition of Nav-Saurashtra magazine. Kantilal Rathod contacted him and convinced him to adapt it into film. Patel also helped him writing script and dialogues of the film.

Soundtrack

Release
The film was released in theatres in 1969. The film was released on Home Video DVD by Moser Baer. It has shorter cut of 136 minutes, 12 minutes less than the original.

Reception
The film was commercially successful and was critically acclaimed. Film critic Amrit Gangar considered Kanku as the "first real spark in Gujarati cinema firmament".

Awards
Pallavi Mehta won an award at 6th Chicago International Film Festival in 1970. The film won the National Film Award for Best Feature Film in Gujarati at the 17th National Film Awards.

Adaptation
After success of film, Pannalal Patel expanded short story into novel and was serialized in Jansatta daily in 1970. He dedicated novel to Kantilal Rathod.

References

External links
 
 

Indian black-and-white films
Films based on short fiction
Films set in Gujarat
Films shot in Gujarat
Indian drama films
1960s Gujarati-language films
Films about widowhood in India